Quetzaltenango (also known by its Maya name Xelajú  or Xela ) is both the seat of the namesake Department and municipality, in Guatemala.

It may reach above  within the city.

Municipalities abutting the municipality of Quetzaltenango include Salcajá, Cantel, Almolonga, Zunil, El Palmar, Concepción Chiquirichapa, San Mateo, La Esperanza, and Olintepeque in Quetzaltenango department and San Andrés Xecul in Totonicapán department.

History

In Pre-Columbian times Quetzaltenango was a city of the Mam Maya people called Xelajú, although by the time of the Spanish Conquest it had become part of the K'iche' Kingdom of Q'umarkaj. The name may be derived from xe laju' noj meaning "under ten mountains". The city was said to have already been over 300 years old when the Spanish first arrived. With the help of his allies, Conquistador Pedro de Alvarado defeated and killed the Maya ruler Tecún Umán here.

When Alvarado conquered the city for Spain in the 1520s, he called it by the Nahuatl name used by his Central Mexican Indian allies, "Quetzaltenango", generally considered to mean "the place of the quetzal bird." Quetzaltenango became the city's official name in colonial times. However, many people (especially the indigenous population) continue to call the city "Xelajú" or more commonly "Xela" for short, and some proudly, but unofficially, consider it the "capital of the Mayas".

From 1838 to 1840 Quetzaltenango was the capital of the state of Los Altos, one of the states or provinces of the Federal Republic of Central America. As the union broke up, the army of  Rafael Carrera conquered Quetzaltenango making it part of Guatemala. In 1850, the city had a population of approximately 20,000.

During the 19th century, coffee was introduced as a major crop in the area. As a result, the economy of Xela prospered. Much fine Belle Époque architecture can still be found in the city.

On October 24, 1902, at 5:00 pm, the Santa María Volcano erupted. Rocks and ash fell on Quetzaltenango at 6 PM, only one hour after the eruption.

In the 1920s, a young Romani woman named Vanushka Cardena Barajas died and was buried in the Xela city cemetery. An active legend has developed around her tomb that says those who bring flowers or write a request on her tomb will be reunited with their former romantic partners. The Guatemalan songwriter Alvaro Aguilar wrote a song based on this legend.

In 1930 the only electric railway in Guatemala, the Ferrocarril de Los Altos, was inaugurated. It was built by AEG and Krupp and had 14 train cars. The track connected Quetzaltenango with San Felipe, Retalhuleu. It was soon destroyed by mudslides and finally demolished in 1933. The people of Quetzaltenango are still very proud of the railway. A railway museum has been established in the city center.

Since the late 1990s Quetzaltenango has been having an economic boom, which makes it the city with the second-highest contribution to the Guatemalan economy. With its first high-rise buildings being built, it is expected by 2015 to have a more prominent skyline, with buildings up to 15 floors tall.
 
In 2008, the Central American Congress PARLACEN announced that every September 15, Quetzaltenango will be Central America's capital of culture.

Quetzaltenango was supposed to host  2018 Central American and Caribbean Games but dropped out due to a lack of funding for the event.

In March 2022, indigenous activists began blockading the central waste deposit near Valle de Palajunoj to protest a  city development plan enacted by the municipal authorities in June 2017.

Climate

According to Köppen climate classification, Quetzaltenango features a subtropical highland climate (Cwb). In general, the climate in Quetzaltenango can go from mild to chilly, with occasional sporadic warm episodes. The daily high is usually reached around noon. From then on, temperatures decrease exceptionally fast. The city is quite dry, except during the rainy season. Quetzaltenango is the coolest major city in Guatemala.

There are two main seasons in Quetzaltenango (as in all of Guatemala); the rainy season, which generally runs from late May through late October, and the dry season, which runs from early November until April. During the rainy season, rain falls consistently, usually in the afternoons, but there are occasions in which it rains all day long or at least during the morning. During the dry season, the city frequently will not receive a single drop of rain for months on end.

The coldest months are November through February, with minimum temperatures averaging , and maximum temperatures averaging . The warmest months are March through July, with minimum temperatures averaging  and maximum temperatures averaging .

Economy
Historically, the city produced wheat, maize, fruits, and vegetables. It also had a healthy livestock industry. Livestock was exported throughout the country and to El Salvador. As of 1850, wheat was the largest export, followed by cacao, sugar, wool and cotton.

Sports 
Quetzaltenango is home to the Club Xelajú MC soccer team. The team competes at Estadio Mario Camposeco which has a capacity of 13,500 and is the most successful non-capital team in the Liga Nacional de Fútbol de Guatemala.

Due to the city's high altitude many athletes have prepared themselves here such as Olympic silver medalist Erick Barrondo and the 2004 Cuban volleyball team.

The swimming team has enjoyed success in national and international events.

Quetzaltenango withdrew from hosting the 2018 Central American and Caribbean Games. It planned to build a 30,000-seat stadium by 2016, as well seven new facilities for indoor sports and aquatics.

Transportation

The city has a system of micro-buses for quick and cheap movement. A micro-bus is essentially a large van stuffed with seats. Micro-buses are numbered based on the route they take (e.g., "Ruta 7"). There is no government-run mass transport system in the city. The sole public means of transport is the bus or micro-buses. Transportation to other cities is provided by bus. Bicycling is a way to get around and to travel to (and in) rural areas. Quetzaltenango Airport provides air service to the city.

Education

Quetzaltenango,(Xela) is the center of many schools and Universities that provide Education to locals and many thousands of students from the surrounding cities and departments (states) and international students from North America and Europe,  that's the reason it's a very important city for the south-west/north-west region of the Country of Guatemala, for many decades Quetzaltenango has produced distinguished Citizens through all Educational establishments, among those we can mention:

 Centro Universitario de Occidente San Carlos de Guatemala (CUNOC)
 Universidad Rafael Landivar
 Universidad Mariano Gálvez
 Universidad Mesoamericana
 Universidad Francisco Marroquín
 Universidad de Occidente
 Universidad Galileo
 Universidad del Istmo (Opus Dei affiliated)
 Universidad Del Valle de Guatemala

People born in Quetzaltenango
 Maria Vicenta Rosal (1820–1886), religious leader
 Manuel Barillas (1845–1907), President of Guatemala
 Jesus Castillo (1877–1946), Musician 
 Ricardo Castillo (1891–1966), composer
 Rodolfo Robles (1878–1939), physician and philanthropist
 Manuel Estrada Cabrera (1898–1924), President of Guatemala
 Domingo Bethancourt (1906-1980), Musician
 Rodolfo Galeotti Torres (1912–1988), sculptor
 Efraín Recinos (1928–2011), engineer, architect, sculptor
 Jacobo Árbenz Guzmán (1913–1971), President of Guatemala
 Alberto Fuentes Mohr (1927–1979), economist, finance minister, foreign minister, social-democratic leaders
 Comandante Rolando Morán (1929-1998), one of the guerrilla leaders in the Guatemalan Civil War
 Carlos Navarrete Cáceres (b. 1931), anthropologist and writer
 Otto René Castillo (b. 1934), poet and revolutionary
 Danilo Lopez (1937-2017), swimmer   
 Juan Arturo Gutierrez, founder of international fast-food chain Pollo Campero
 Luis Rolando Ixquiac Xicara (b. 1947), artist
Julio Serrano Echeverría (b. 1983), poet and writer

Consular representations
 Consulate of El Salvador
 Consulate of Italy
 Consulate of Mexico
Consulate of Spain

Twin towns – sister cities

Quetzaltenango is twinned with:

 Campeche, Mexico
 Chiapa de Corzo, Mexico
 Livermore, United States
 San Cristóbal de Las Casas, Mexico
 Santa Fe, Spain
 Santa María Huatulco, Mexico
 Tapachula, Mexico
 Tromsø, Norway
 Turin, Italy
 Veracruz, Mexico

See also
 Hospital Nacional San Juan de Dios
 Luna de Xelajú
 History of Guatemala
 History of Central America

References

External links

 
Municipalities of the Quetzaltenango Department